Chantabbai is a 1986 Indian Telugu-language comedy drama film written and directed by Jandhyala. It is based on the novel of same name by Malladi Venkata Krishna Murthy. Produced by Jyothi Art Pictures, the film stars Chiranjeevi and Suhasini while Jaggayya and Mucherla Aruna play supporting roles. The film has music composed by K. Chakravarthy. Released on 22 August 1986, the film received critical acclaim and was commercially successful and attained a Cult Classic Status among movie lovers. The film has acquired a cult status over the years.

Plot 
Panduranga "Pandu" Rao is an amateur detective employed at Universal Detective Agency in Visakhapatnam, which is run and managed by Ramachandra Murthy. He considers James Bond as his idol, and models himself after him in terms of appearance and gives himself the name "James Pond". Neither the police nor his colleagues take Pandu seriously, including his assistant Ganapathi and the local police inspector Saumitri. Pandu harbours feelings for Jwala, a self-employed telephone cleaner. She considers him as a good friend, but does not take his professional abilities seriously.

Once, Jwala visits the house of a businessman to clean his telephone, but finds herself holding a hand gun instead of telephone receiver. She is accused of killing the businessman and theft of diamonds he possessed. Pandu takes up the case, but is interrupted by Murthy, who was appointed by the police to help them as a detective. Pandu refuses to give up and continues to investigate unofficially. Meanwhile, Jwala's friend Nischala, a surgeon, arranges her release on bail.

As a part of his investigation, Pandu calls Jwala to his office for an interrogation, which goes horribly wrong. However, Pandu gets to know that Jwala spotted a chocolate brown-coloured Maruti car parked outside the businessman's house on the day of murder. He notices Murthy using a similar car and contacting jewellers outside Visakhapatnam. Pandu grows suspicious, and spies on Murthy with Saumitri's help. They eventually catch Murthy confessing his crime to a jeweller and arrest him. Pandu is subsequently appointed as the head of Universal Detective Agency.

Upon Jwala's recommendation, Nischala approaches Pandu with a case: to find her missing half brother who was nicknamed Chantabbai (younger one). Chantabbai was born to Nischala's father Gangadharam and his love interest Sharmishta out of wedlock. Gangadharam was later coerced to marry Nischala's mother, who managed to keep them apart until her demise. With Gangadharam's health deteriorating severely, Nischala wants to bring Chantabbai before him and make him happy.

Pandu takes up the case and finds that Gangadharam's friend Ramkoti took care of Sharmistha and Chantabbai for a while. Upon investigating, Pandu learns that Ramkoti had two sons Kalyan and Pattabhi, and favoured the former more. Pandu concludes that Kalyan is Gangadharam's son and introduces him to the family. Days later, Pattabhi comes to Gangadharam's house and claims himself as Chantabbai.

Pandu finds himself challenged with the outcome and tries several ways to deduce the real heir. All of them fail due to several loopholes, but the results of a blood test manipulated by both makes Pandu believe that both of them are fraudsters. Gangadharam expels both from his house, and the brothers swear revenge. Meanwhile, Pandu and Jwala fall in love and plan for their marriage.

One day, Pandu learns from Nischala that Chantabbai's aunt Bala has arrived to Visakhapatnam for a family function. Pandu goes to meet Bala and learns that his mother was the Sharmistha whom Gangadharam loved. Realising that he is Chantabbai, Pandu recalls the hardships he faced as a child and how he was ostracized by the society for his illegitimate origins. Pandu refuses to return to Gangadharam's place as his son, unless the share of wealth he would inherit be donated to the orphanage he runs in the city. Nischala agrees to the condition and mediates.

Meanwhile, Kalyan and Pattabhi kidnap Pandu and demand ransom from Gangadharam. Pandu sens a letter explaining his plight and requests to save him. However, Ganapathi notices number '1' written on the sheet and starts reading the first letters of the message together; they reveal an instruction to tell the kidnappers that he is not the real heir to Gangadharam.

Gangadharam executes the plan, and Pandu leads the brothers to a house. There, they notice Gangadharam playing cards with his friend, and proceed to kidnap him. However, Saumitri enters the scene and arrests them. The film ends with Gangadharam accepting Pandu as his son, and his marriage with Jwala.

Cast

Reception 
Karthik Keramulu of Dailyo called opined that the film was a casting coup in that Chiranjeevi, who was an action hero, was cast as a bumbling private detective in a full-length comedy.

Soundtrack 
The music of the film was composed by K. Chakravarthy and lyrics written by Veturi. Vocals were provided by S. P. Balasubrahmanyam, S.P. Sailaja, and P. Susheela.

References

External links 
 

1986 films
Films directed by Jandhyala
Films scored by K. Chakravarthy
1980s Telugu-language films
Films based on Indian novels
1980s police comedy films
1980s comedy thriller films
1980s crime comedy films
1980s comedy mystery films
1980s crime thriller films
Indian comedy thriller films
Indian crime comedy films
Indian detective films
Indian comedy mystery films
Indian mystery thriller films
Indian crime thriller films
1980s masala films
1986 comedy films